Thylacospermum is a genus of flowering plants belonging to the family Caryophyllaceae.

Its native range is Central Asia to Central China and Himalaya.

Species:
 Thylacospermum caespitosum (Cambess.) Schischk. 
 Thylacospermum rupifragum (Kar. & Kir.) Schrenk

References

Caryophyllaceae
Caryophyllaceae genera